Randolph Academy may refer to:

Randolph Academy for the Performing Arts, a private career college specializing in singing, dancing and acting founded in Toronto, Ontario in 1992
Randolph-Macon Academy, a coeducational college preparatory school for students in grades 6–12 and postgraduates founded in Front Royal, Virginia in 1892
Institutions named in honor of Asa Phillip Randolph
A. Philip Randolph Academies of Technology, also known as Randolph Skill Center High School, in Jacksonville, Florida 
Randolph Technical High School, a Philadelphia public high school